Corporate Office Properties Trust is a real estate investment trust that invests in office buildings, mostly in the suburbs of the Washington, D.C. metropolitan area. It primarily leases to the U.S. government or companies in the arms industry. As of December 31, 2019, the company owned 148 office buildings comprising 15.4 million square feet and 22 single-tenant data centers comprising 3.7 million square feet.

Tenants
The company's largest tenants are as follows:

History
The company was founded in 1988 by Clay W. Hamlin III as Royale Investments, Inc. It became a public company via an  initial public offering in 1991.

References

External links

1988 establishments in Maryland
1991 initial public offerings
Companies based in Columbia, Maryland
Companies listed on the New York Stock Exchange
Real estate investment trusts of the United States